Carl Robert Zelnick (August 9, 1940 – September 23, 2019) was an American journalist, author and professor of journalism at the Boston University College of Communication, and winner of two Emmy Awards and two Gavel Awards.

Career 
Early in his career, Zelnick worked for The Christian Science Monitor, National Public Radio, and the Anchorage Daily News, and was executive editor of the Frost–Nixon interviews. (In the 2008 film Frost/Nixon, Zelnick is portrayed by Oliver Platt.)

He was a correspondent for ABC News for more than 20 years. His assignments included national political and congressional affairs (1994–98), the Pentagon (1986–94), Israel (1984–86) and Moscow (1982–84).

In 1998, he began teaching at Boston University, where he chaired the journalism department from 2002 to 2006.

He was a research fellow at Stanford University's Hoover Institution.

Life 
Zelnick was convicted in 2013 of misdemeanor negligent motor vehicle homicide and the civil infraction of failure to yield for an incident in October 2011, when he struck and killed a motorcyclist in Plymouth, Massachusetts.

He is of Jewish descent.

Books 
The Illusion of Net Neutrality: Political Alarmism, Regulatory Creep, and the Real End to Internet Freedom (2013), coauthored with his daughter, Eva Zelnick
Israel's Unilateralism: Beyond Gaza (2006)
Swing Dance: Justice O'Connor and the Michigan Muddle (2004)
Winning Florida: How the Bush Team Fought the Battle (2001) 
Gore: A Political Life (2000)
Backfire: A Reporter's Look at Affirmative Action (1996)

References

External links
Robert Zelnick (2006):  Israel's Unilaterialism: Beyond Gaza Hoover Press, 170 pages

Emmy Award winners
Writers from New York City
Jewish American journalists
ABC News personalities
Boston University faculty
Hoover Institution people
The Christian Science Monitor people
1940 births
2019 deaths
20th-century American journalists
American male journalists